Zakrzewice  is a village in the administrative district of Gmina Książ Wielkopolski, within Śrem County, Greater Poland Voivodeship, in west-central Poland.

The village has a population of 304.

References

Zakrzewice